Leptopoma perlucidum is a species of land snail with a gill and an operculum, a terrestrial gastropod mollusk in the family Cyclophoridae.

Distribution 
This species occurs in Indonesia, Sabah (Malaysia), the Philippines, and the Solomon Islands.

Description
The color of the shell is actually translucently milky-white, and the green color is from the mantle.

References

 Vermeulen, J. J. (1999). Notes on the non-marine molluscs of the island of Borneo 9. The genera Cyclophorus, Leptopoma, and Craspedotropis (Gastropoda Prosobranchia: Cyclophoridae). Basteria. 63: 139-163.
Vol. III. Trochomorphidae and systematical review of all other families. Ancona: L'Informatore Piceno. 160 pp

External links
 Grateloup, J.P.S. de. (1840 ["1839"]). Note sur un mémoire relatif à des molluques exotiques nouveaux ou peu connus. Actes de la Société Linnéene de Bordeaux. 11 : 161–170
 Reeve, L. A. (1841–1842). Conchologia Systematica, or complete system of conchology; in which the Lepades and conchiferous Mollusca are described and classified according to their natural organization and habits. Longman, Brown, Green, & Longman's, London
 Lesson R.P. (1830–1831). Voyage autour du monde, exécuté par ordre du Roi, sur la corvette de Sa Majesté, La Coquille, pendant les années 1822, 1823, 1824 et 1825. Zoologie, 2(1)
 Pfeiffer, L. (1858). Monographia Pneumonopomorum viventium. Sistens descriptiones systematicas et criticas omnium hujus ordinis generum et specierum hodie cognitarum, accedente fossilium enume-ratione. Supplementum primum. i–vi, 1–249. Cassellis: Theodori Fischeri / London: Williams & Norgate / Paris: Friedr. Klincksieck
 Pfeiffer, L. (1862). Descriptions of Sixteen New Species of Land-shells from the Collection of H. Cuming, Esq. Proceedings of the zoological Society of London. 29 (25)
 Iredale, T. (1941). A basic list of the land Mollusca of Papua. The Australian Zoologist. 10(1): 51–94, pls. 3–4
 Bartsch, P. (1919). Critical remarks on Philippine landshells with descriptions of new forms. Proceedings of the Biological Society of Washington. 32: 15–19
 

Cyclophoridae
Fauna of Indonesia
Invertebrates of Malaysia
Molluscs of the Philippines
Fauna of the Solomon Islands
Gastropods described in 1840